The Kronoberg Regiment, designations I 11 and I 11/Fo 16, was a Swedish Army infantry regiment that traced its origins back to the 16th century. It was disbanded in 1997. The regiment's soldiers were originally recruited from Kronoberg County, and it was later garrisoned there.

History 
The regiment has its origins in fänikor (companies) raised in Kronoberg County in the 16th century. In 1616, these units—along with fänikor from the nearby Kalmar County—were organised by Gustav II Adolf into Smålands storregemente, of which twelve of the total 24 companies were recruited in Kronoberg County. Smålands storregemente consisted of three field regiments, of which Kronoberg Regiment was one. Sometime around 1623, the grand regiment was permanently split into three smaller regiments, of which Kronoberg Regiment was one.

Kronoberg Regiment was one of the original 20 Swedish infantry regiments mentioned in the Swedish constitution of 1634, although it was mentioned as one of two regiments that should merge to form Småland Regiment, but that regiment was never formed and instead Kronoberg Regiment and Jönköping Regiment were kept separate. The regiment's first commander was Patrick Ruthwen. The regiment was allotted in 1684. The regiment was given the designation I 11 (11th Infantry Regiment) in a general order in 1816.

Kronoberg Regiment was garrisoned in Växjö from 1920. In 1974, the regiment gained the new designation I 11/Fo 16 as a consequence of a merge with the local defence district Fo 16. The regiment was disbanded in 1997.

Campaigns 
The War against Sigismund (1598–1599)
The Polish War (1600–1629)
The Thirty Years' War (1630–1648)
The Torstenson War (1643–1645)
The Northern Wars (1655–1661)
The Scanian War (1674–1679)
The Great Northern War (1700–1721)
The Seven Years' War (1757–1762)
The Gustav III's Russian War (1788–1790)
The First War against Napoleon (1805–1810)
The Finnish War (1808–1809)
The War of the Sixth Coalition (1813–1814)

Organisation 

1684(?)
Livkompaniet
Överstelöjtnantens kompani
Majorens kompani
Albo kompani
Norra Sunnerbo kompani
Norrvidinge kompani
Kinnevalds kompani
Södra Sunnerbo kompani

18??
Livkompaniet
Skatelövs kompani
Kinnevalds kompani
Norrvidinge kompani
Ljungby kompani
Södra Sunnerbo kompani
Albo kompani
Norra Sunnerbo kompani

Heraldry and traditions

Colours, standards and guidons
The regiment has carried a number of different colours over the years. The last colour was presented to the regiment in Växjö by the Chief of the Army, lieutenant general, count Carl August Ehrensvärd on 6 June 1956. The new colour replaced the one from 1893. The new colour was used as regimental colour by I 11/Fo 16 until 1 September 1997. The colour is drawn by Brita Grep and embroidered by hand in insertion technique by Libraria. Blazon: "On yellow cloth the provincial badge of Småland; a red lion rampant with blue arms, in the forepaws a red crossbow with white arrowhead and black bow, string and trigger. On a red border at the upper side of the colour, battle honours (Breitenfeld 1631, Lützen 1632, Wittstock 1636, Landskrona 1677, Kliszow 1702, Warszawa 1705, Fraustadt 1706, Holovczyn 1708, Hälsingborg 1710, Valkeala 1790) in yellow".

Coat of arms
The coat of the arms of the Kronoberg Regiment (I 11/Fo 16) 1977–1997 and the Kronoberg Group 1997–2004. Blazon: "Or, the provincial badge of Småland, a double-tailed lion rampant gules, armed and langued azure, in the forepaws a crossbow gules, arrow-head argent, bow and string sable. The shield surmounted two muskets in saltire or".

Medals
The medal ribbon is divided in yellow, red and yellow moiré.

The medal ribbon is of red moiré with two yellow stripes on each side. The ribbon is attached to a narrow pole carried by two slanting ornaments of leaves.

Heritage
In connection with the disbandment of the regiment through the Defence Act of 1996, its traditions came from 1 December 1998 onwards to be continued by Kronoberg Group (Kronobergsgruppen). From 1 July 2013, the Kronoberg Battalion, within Kalmar and Kronoberg Group is the traditional keeper of Kronoberg Regiment.

Commanding officers
Regimental commanders active at the regiment during the years 1627–1997.

Commanders

1627–1630: Patrik Ruthwens 
1630–1638: Hans Drake 
1638–1641: Adolf Hård
1641–1654: Georg Fleetwood
1654–1657: Adolf Herman Wrangel 
1657–1665: Bertil Nilson Skytte
1665–1677: Henrik von Vicken
1677–1678: Georg Anthony Brakel
1678–1696: Abraham Cronhjort
1696–1703: Gustaf Heidenfeldt
1703–1706: Gabriel Lilliehöök 
1706–1709: Johan Cronman 
1709–1714: Carl Hästesko (acting)
1714–1717: Sven Lagerberg
1718–1746: Eberhard Bildstein
1722–1727: Johan Cronman
1747–1746: Eberhard Bildstein
1746–1765: Berndt Wilhelm von Liewen
1765–1772: Pehr Scheffer
1772–1777: Otto Wilhelm von Rosen 
1777–1782: Salomon Hederstjerna
1782–1812: Carl Axel Strömfelt
1812–1816: Elof Rosenblad
1816–1824: Erland Hederstjerna 
1824–1856: Carl Henrik Wrede 
1856–1862: Georg Miles Fleetwood 
1862–1873: Gustaf Reinhold Weidenhielm
1873–1878: Otto Samuel Gustaf von Klint
1878–1889: Klas Hjalmar Kreüger
1889–1898: Henrik Esaias Anton Carl Rappe
1898–1905: Johan Gustaf Wikander
1905–1920: Gösta Hyltén-Cavallius
1920–1924: Gustaf Ros
1924–1928: Erik Nordenskjöld
1928–1932: Erik Grafström
1932–1937: Per Erlandsson
1937–1941: Gösta Hahr
1941–1946: Sven Allstrin
1946–1950: Gustaf Källner
1950–1957: Colonel Carl von Horn
1957–1967: Thor Cavallin
1967–1972: Lennart Löfgrén
1972–1974: Per-Hugo Winberg
1974–1977: Bertil Malgerud
1977–1980: Per-Hugo Winberg
1980–1983: Senior colonel Sven Skeppstedt
1983–1988: Finn Werner
1988–1989: Björn Swärdenheim
1989–1992: Leif Fransson
1993–1993: Inge Lennart Sandahl (acting)
1993–1997: Jan Henrik Edvard Hyltén-Cavallius

Deputy commanders
1978–????: Colonel Åke Lundin
1988–1991: Colonel Wilhelm af Donner

Names, designations and locations

See also
List of Swedish infantry regiments

Footnotes

References

Notes

Print

Further reading

Infantry regiments of the Swedish Army
Disbanded units and formations of Sweden
Military units and formations established in 1623
Military units and formations disestablished in 1709
Military units and formations established in 1709
Military units and formations disestablished in 1997